Evan Solomon (born April 20, 1968) is a Canadian columnist, political journalist,  radio host, and publisher. Until 2022, he was the host of The Evan Solomon Show on Toronto-area talk radio station CFRB, and a writer for Maclean's magazine. He was the host of CTV's national political news programs Power Play and Question Period.

In October 2022, he moved to New York City to accept a position with the Eurasia Group as publisher of GZERO Media. Solomon continues with CTV News as a "special correspondent" reporting on Canadian politics and global affairs."

Life and career
Solomon was born in Toronto, Ontario, the son of Virginia, an urban planner, and Carl Solomon, a lawyer. He graduated from high school at Crescent School in Toronto, Ontario. He then graduated from McGill University in English literature and religious studies.

In 1992, Solomon co-founded Shift with Andrew Heintzman. Originally an arts and culture magazine, Shift evolved to focus particularly on technology and Internet culture. Solomon left the magazine in 1999 to promote his first novel, Crossing the Distance. Solomon has also worked as a broadcaster, hosting the series The Changemakers, FutureWorld and Hot Type for the Canadian Broadcasting Corporation. In 2004, Solomon worked as co-editor, with Heintzman, on Fueling the Future: How the Battle Over Energy is Changing Everything.  He was the co-anchor with Carole MacNeil of CBC News: Sunday and CBC News: Sunday Night from 2004 to 2009.

In 2009, Solomon was chosen to host the political discussion show Power & Politics on CBC News Network and CBC Radio One's weekly political affairs series The House.

On June 9, 2015, Solomon was fired from CBC after the Toronto Star reported that he allegedly took secret commissions for brokering art sales of items owned by his friend and art collector Bruce Bailey to people he was connected to through his CBC position. It was reported that Solomon pocketed $300,000 from commissions from these sales.

In August 2015, Sirius XM Canada announced that it had hired Solomon to host a political talk show, Everything Is Political, on its Canada Talks channel during the 2015 election. Solomon also wrote a column for Maclean's magazine for the duration of the election campaign.

In 2016, Solomon announced that he was joining the Ottawa-area talk radio station CFRA.

From 2016 to 2022, he was the host of CTV's political affairs program Question Period and was also a substitute anchor for CTV National News.

In September 2017, Solomon joined CFRB in Toronto for a new national talk radio program, The Evan Solomon Show, that aired on Bell Media radio stations nationally until Solomon's departure in October 2022.

Personal life 
Solomon is married to Tammy Quinn. The couple has two children.

References

1968 births
Canadian male novelists
Canadian television news anchors
Canadian Screen Award winning journalists
Living people
McGill University alumni
Writers from Toronto
CBC Radio hosts
CBC Television people
20th-century Canadian novelists
Canadian magazine publishers (people)
Canadian radio journalists
Canadian columnists
Maclean's writers and editors
Canadian political journalists
Canadian talk radio hosts
CTV Television Network people
20th-century Canadian journalists
21st-century Canadian journalists
20th-century Canadian male writers
Canadian male non-fiction writers
Jewish Canadian journalists
American publishers (people)